Common names: Cuban dusky dwarf boa.

Tropidophis fuscus is a nonvenomous dwarf boa species endemic to Cuba. There are no subspecies that are recognized as being valid.

Description
The color pattern consists of a dark brown ground color with black spotting.

Geographic range
T. fuscus is only found in Cuba, where it is known only from two areas, Cruzata and Minas Amores, in northeastern Guantánamo Province. The type locality given is "Minas Amores (21.7 km NW, 7.7 km SE Baracoa, by road), Guantánamo Province, Cuba, 76 m."

Habitat
The preferred natural habitat of T. fuscus is pine forests.

References

Tropidophiidae
Snakes of the Caribbean
Reptiles of Cuba
Endemic fauna of Cuba
Reptiles described in 1992
Taxa named by Stephen Blair Hedges